Sengoku-ike is an earthfill dam located in Toyama prefecture in Japan. The dam is used for irrigation. The catchment area of the dam is 1.2 km2. The dam impounds about 27  ha of land when full and can store 270 thousand cubic meters of water. The construction of the dam was completed in 1965.

References

Dams in Toyama Prefecture
1965 establishments in Japan